Bank Maskan (Bank Mesken), also known as the Housing Bank, is a bank in Iran. In 2008, the Central Bank banned all banks and other financial institutions, except for Maskan Bank, from providing residential mortgages.

Structure
Their subsidiaries include:
Housing Investment Company (Šerkat Sarmāye Gozāri Maskan), established 1991; they received the Iran National Quality Award (جايزه ملي كيفيت ايران) in 2004

History
A new CEO Mahmood Shayan was appointed in August 2020.

See also

Banking and Insurance in Iran
Construction in Iran
Ministry of Housing and Urban Development (Iran)

References

External links
['https://www.bank-maskan.ir/web/english]

Banks established in 1979
Companies listed on the Tehran Stock Exchange
Banks of Iran
Iranian companies established in 1979
Iranian entities subject to the U.S. Department of the Treasury sanctions